The Anvil is the second studio album by the British rock/pop band Visage, released in March 1982 by Polydor Records. The album reached No. 6 in the UK and was certified "Silver" by the British Phonographic Industry in April 1982.

Recording 
The Anvil was recorded in the latter part of 1981 at Mayfair Studios, London by the same line-up of the first album, except for
John McGeoch who had left both Visage and Magazine to join Siouxsie and the Banshees. Original Visage bassist Barry Adamson rejoined as a session musician and contributed to several tracks.

Release 

The Anvil was released in March 1982. It reached No. 6 on the UK Albums Chart, which was the band's highest ever chart peak in the UK, and was certified "Silver" by the British Phonographic Industry in April 1982. The album sparked a brief controversy at the time of its release for being named after New York's famous gay bar/nightclub of the era.

The album's first single was "The Damned Don't Cry" which was released three weeks ahead of the album and reached No. 11 in the UK Singles Chart. The second single released was "Night Train" in June 1982, reaching No. 12. The album's title track was remixed and released as a promo single as well as a German-language 12" version ("Der Amboss"), and "Whispers" was also released as a single in Japan (where both it and "Night Train" were used in TDK television commercials).

The album's front cover photograph was taken by Helmut Newton. The original vinyl release of the album came in an embossed/textured sleeve (considered as deluxe packaging for the time), and a limited number of copies (3,000) came with a free poster of Steve Strange posing with a number of models at the Hôtel George-V in Paris (the poster is an extended shot of the 12" single cover of "The Damned Don't Cry").

The Anvil was the last Visage record to feature Ultravox frontman Midge Ure, who left the band after its release. Commenting on his departure the following year, Ure stated: 

In later years, when reflecting upon the album, Ure also stated he felt the track "Again We Love" would have been a good single.

The album's first release on the compact disc format was in Germany in 1983. It was re-issued on CD in the United States in 1997 by One Way Records, complete with two bonus tracks (though they are tracks from the 1980–81 era and not that of The Anvil). The Anvil was re-issued in the UK on CD by Cherry Red Records on 17 March 2008, containing six bonus tracks and detailed liner notes. A Remastered Edition, mastered from the original tapes, was released on CD in the US in 2020 by Rubellan Remasters including all the B sides and Dance mixes from the singles.

Reception 

In his retrospective review, Dan LeRoy of AllMusic wrote that "almost all the band's efforts on The Anvil are extremely well-crafted synth pop." Emily Mackay of Record Collector opined that the album "[still] sounds remarkably fresh."

Track listing

Personnel

Visage
 Steve Strange – lead vocals
 Midge Ure – guitars, backing vocals, synthesizer
 Dave Formula – synthesizer
 Billy Currie – electric violin, synthesizer
 Rusty Egan – drums, backing vocals, electronic drums

Additional personnel
 Barry Adamson – bass
 Gary Barnacle – saxophone
 Perri Lister – backing vocals
 Lorraine Whitmarsh – backing vocals

Charts

Weekly charts

Year-end charts

Certifications

References

External links 

 

1982 albums
Visage (band) albums
Albums produced by Midge Ure
Polydor Records albums